Namagiri may refer to:

 Namakkal, municipality in Tamil Nadu, India and its namesake, a large rock
 Namagiri Thayar, Hindu Goddess, form of Lakshmi
 Namagiripettai block, a revenue block in the Namakkal district of Tamil Nadu, India.
 Namagiripettai Krishnan (1924 – 2001), a Carnatic musician born in Namagiripettai